Tom Boswell may refer to:
 Tom Boswell (basketball) (born 1953), American basketball player
 Tom Boswell (television presenter) (1943–1990), British radio and television journalist

See also
 Thomas Boswell (born 1947), American sports columnist